Sophus is a male given name. Notable people with the given name include:

Sophus Aars (1841–1931), Norwegian civil servant and writer
Sophus Andersen (1859–1923), Danish composer and music critic
Sophus Black (1882–1960), Danish telegraph manager and art collector
Sophus Bugge (1833–1907), Norwegian philologist and linguist
Sophus Christensen (1848–1920), Norwegian military officer
Sophus Frederik Kühnel (1851–1930), Danish architect
Sophus Hagen (1842–1929), Danish composer
Sophus Halle (1862–1924), Danish composer
Sophus Hansen (1889–1962), Danish amateur football (soccer) player and referee
Sophus Lie (1842–1899), Norwegian mathematician
Sophus Michaëlis (1865–1932), Danish poet, novelist and playwright
Sophus Müller (1846–1934), Danish archaeologist
Sophus Nielsen (1888–1963), Danish amateur football player and manager
Sophus Ruge (1831–1903), German geographer and historian
Sophus Schandorph (1836–1901), Danish poet and novelist
Sophus August Wilhelm Stein (1797–1868), Danish surgeon and anatomist 
Sophus Thalbitzer (1871–1941), Danish psychiatrist
Sophus Torup (1861–1937), Danish physiologist
Sophus Wangøe (1873–1943), Danish cinematographer
Sophus Weidemann (1836–1894), Norwegian engineer and industrialist 
Sophus Keith Winther (1893–1983), Danish-American professor and novelist

Masculine given names